Mepindolol (Betagon) is a non-selective beta blocker. It is used to treat glaucoma.

See also
 Pindolol

References 

Beta blockers
Indole ethers at the benzene ring
N-isopropyl-phenoxypropanolamines